American Beauty is a lost 1927 American silent film romantic drama produced and distributed by First National Pictures. This film was directed by Richard Wallace and starred Billie Dove. It is based on a short story American Beauty by Wallace Irwin. Walter McGrail and Margaret Livingston are also in the cast.

The story
Billy Dove stars as the title character, Millicent Howard, whose appearance and persona bring her a life of luxury. A millionaire named Claverhouse asks her to marry, but she values love more than wealth, and she sacrifices everything for another man, who is less wealthy, Jerry Booth. A number of scenes require Millicent to disrobe except for her underthings.  The actress, Billy Dove, is known for her love affair with Howard Hughes.

Cast
 Billie Dove  Millicent Howard
 Lloyd Hughes  Jerry Booth
 Walter McGrail  Claverhouse
 Margaret Livingston  Mrs. Gillespie
 Lucien Prival  Gillespie
 Al St. John  Waiter
 Edythe Chapman  Madame O'Riley
 Alice White  Claire O'Riley
 Yola d'Avril  Telephone Girl

References

External links
 
 
 lobby poster

1927 films
American silent feature films
Lost American films
Films directed by Richard Wallace
Films based on short fiction
First National Pictures films
American black-and-white films
1927 romantic drama films
American romantic drama films
1927 lost films
1920s American films
Silent romantic drama films
Silent American drama films